The canton of Marquise is a former canton situated in the department of the Pas-de-Calais and in the Nord-Pas-de-Calais region of northern France. It was disbanded following the French canton reorganisation which came into effect in March 2015. It consisted of 21 communes, which joined the canton of Desvres in 2015. It had a total of 21,997 inhabitants (2012).

Geography 
The canton is organised around Marquise in the arrondissement of Boulogne-sur-Mer. The altitude varies from 0m (Ambleteuse) to 163m (Leubringhen) for an average altitude of 72m.

The canton comprised 21 communes:

Ambleteuse
Audembert
Audinghen
Audresselles
Bazinghen
Beuvrequen
Ferques
Hervelinghen
Landrethun-le-Nord
Leubringhen
Leulinghen-Bernes
Maninghen-Henne
Marquise
Offrethun
Rety
Rinxent
Saint-Inglevert
Tardinghen
Wacquinghen
Wierre-Effroy
Wissant

Population

See also 
Cantons of Pas-de-Calais 
Communes of Pas-de-Calais 
Arrondissements of the Pas-de-Calais department

References

Marquise
2015 disestablishments in France
States and territories disestablished in 2015